The Modern Style is a style of architecture, art, and design that first emerged in the United Kingdom in the mid-1880s. It is the first Art Nouveau style worldwide, and it represents the evolution of the Arts and Crafts movement which was native to Great Britain. Britain not only provided the base and intellectual background for the Art Nouveau movement, which was adapted by other countries to give birth to local variants; they also played an over-sized role in its dissemination and cultivation through the Liberty department store and The Studio magazine. The most important person in the field of design in general and architecture in particular, was Charles Rennie Mackintosh. He created one of the key motifs of the movement, now known as the 'Mackintosh rose' or 'Glasgow rose'. The Glasgow School was also of tremendous importance, particularly due to a group closely associated with Mackintosh, known as 'The Four'. The Liberty store nurturing of style gave birth to two metalware lines, Cymric and Tudric.

Archibald Knox was a defining person of these lines and metalware of the style. In the field of ceramic and glass Christopher Dresser is a standout figure. Not only did he work with the most prominent ceramic manufacturers but became a crucial person behind James Couper & Sons trademarking of Clutha glass inspired by ancient Rome in 1888. Aubrey Beardsley was a defining person in graphic and drawing, and influenced painting and style in general. In textiles William Morris and C. F. A. Voysey are of huge importance, although most artists were versatile and worked in many mediums and fields, influencing them all to an extent. Because of the natural evolution of Arts and Crafts to Modern Style, lines can be blurred and many designers, artists, and craftsmen worked in both styles simultaneously. Important figures include Charles Robert Ashbee, Walter Crane, Léon-Victor Solon, George Skipper, Charles Harrison Townsend, Arthur Mackmurdo, William James Neatby.

History

Origins

Art Nouveau had its origins in Britain, mainly in the work of William Morris and Arts and Crafts movement which was founded by students of Morris. Through Morris, formative and essential influence will be Pre-Raphaelite brotherhood, which was in turn championed and sometimes even financially supported by John Ruskin. Ruskin's influence on the formation of Arts and Crafts and Modern Style is hard to overstate. Arts and Crafts movement called for better treatment of decorative arts, believed all objects should be made beautiful and took inspiration from folklore, medieval craftsmanship and design, and nature. Red House, Bexleyheath (1860), architectural work by Philip Webb with interiors done by William Morris is one of the early prototypes. Work of Arthur Mackmurdo is the earliest fully realized form of the Art Nouveau, his Mahogany chair from 1883 and design for a cover for essay Wren's City Churches are recognized by art historians as the very first works in the new style. Mackmurdo's work shows influence of another British illustrator William Blake, whose designs for Songs of Innocence and of Experience from 1789 certainly point to even earlier origin of Art Nouveau. Unlike Europe, in Great Britain there was no radical break, no revolution. Artists and architects simply continued spirit of innovation, which was the essence of Arts and Crafts. Art Nouveau is natural evolution of Arts and Crafts movement.

Development
Fertile ground for this new style will be Scotland, Glasgow in particular. The city already had significant artistic activity, The Glasgow Art Institute was founded in 1879. As pretty much every European variation it will be influenced by Japonisme  which was in vogue but with the addition of Celtic revival and its nationalistic tone. Archibald Knox was prominent figure in formation of new style that built on the foundation of Arts and Crafts with conscious addition of Celtic elements, as he was from the Isle of Man and interested in his Celtic roots. Christopher Dresser and his interest in Japanese design will add important ingredient information of Modern Style. Style did exist in England as well, but artists there gravitated slightly more towards Arts and Crafts. Most prominent figures will be Charles Rennie Mackintosh and people closely associated with him also known as "The Four", and the Glasgow School because of which style was also known as the "Glasgow Style".

Pieces designed by William Morris, Archibald Knox, and Christopher Dresser were on sale in a newly opened department store called Liberty, in London's Regent Street, in 1875.
Arthur Lasenby Liberty with his great business skills fused Arts and Crafts aesthetic, Celtic Britain with popular demand for oriental design. He opened the second store in Paris in 1890.
In the 1890s, Liberty (department store) collaborated with many British designers and artists, mainly working in Arts and Crafts style that has by then evolved in Art Nouveau. The store became synonymous with the new style, to the extent that Art Nouveau is sometimes called Stile Liberty in Italy. Both styles co-existed and numerous artists contributed to both styles and played role in developing them. Therefore, blurring the lines and distinction, a good example of this is Charles Rennie Mackintosh whose architecture work was very much in the Glasgow style, but parts of the interior in those same buildings could lean more in Arts and Crafts direction, particularly when it comes to furniture.

In 1900, the Glasgow Four and some English artists like Charles Robert Ashbee with his Guild and School of Handicraft from London were invited to participate in the Vienna Secession's 8th exhibition. They were huge influence on the artists of Vienna Secession and Viennese art scene. Modern Style artists will strongly influence Koloman Moser and Josef Hoffmann, and inspire them to establish Wiener Werkstätte.

Influence of British was vast and Anglomania was unbearable for some, writer Charles Genuys in 1897 declares it is time to shake it off. In 1901 Jean Lahor stated that William Morris and John Ruskin are precursors to Art Nouveau.

Painting

The decisive inlueces on the painting, and one of formative influences on the style in general will be Pre-Raphaelite Brotherhood. They will influence Arts and Crafts movement, Symbolism, Aestheticism and Modern Style. Dante Gabriel Rossetti and Edward Burne-Jones are among most important figures associated with the brotherhood.

The group known as "The Four" will make the biggest impact in the field of painting and the style in general. The group consisted of Charles Rennie Mackintosh, his friend Herbert MacNair, and sisters Frances MacDonald and Margaret Macdonald Mackintosh. "The Four" met at painting classes at Glasgow School of art in 1891. Frances married Herbert in 1899 and Margaret married Charles in 1900. Although all were great artists in their own right, Margaret was a stand out when it comes to painting, she greatly influenced Charles and he praised her as a genius. Both sisters were influenced by the work of William Blake and Aubrey Beardsley and this is reflected in their use of elongated figures and linear elements. Margaret exhibited with her husband at the 1900 Vienna Secession, where they were an influence on Gustav Klimt, Josef Hoffmann, and artist that will form Wiener Werkstätte. They continued to be popular in the Viennese art scene, both exhibiting at the Viennese International Art Exhibit in 1909.

In 1902, the couple received a major Viennese commission: Fritz Waerndorfer, the initial financer of the Wiener Werkstätte, was building a new villa outside Vienna showcasing the work of many local architects. Hoffmann and Koloman Moser were already designing two of its rooms; he invited the Mackintoshes to design the music room. That room was decorated with panels of Margaret's art: the Opera of the Winds, the Opera of the Seas, and the Seven Princesses, a new wall-sized triptych considered by some to be her finest work. This collaboration was described by contemporary critic Amelia Levetus as "perhaps their greatest work, for they were allowed perfectly free scope".

Graphic and drawing
The first appearance of the curving, sinuous forms that came to be called Art Nouveau is traditionally attributed to Arthur Heygate Mackmurdo (1851–1942) in 1883.  They were soon adopted by pre-Raphaelite painter Edward Burne-Jones and Aubrey Beardsley in the 1890s.  They were following the advice of the art historian and critic John Ruskin, who urged artists to "go to nature" for their inspiration.

In Britain, one of the first leading graphic artists in what became Art Nouveau style was Aubrey Beardsley (1872–1898). He began with engraved book illustrations for Le Morte d'Arthur, then black and white illustrations for Salome by Oscar Wilde (1893), which brought him fame. In the same year, he began engraving illustrations and posters for the art magazine The Studio, which helped publicize European artists such as Fernand Khnopff in Britain. The curving lines and intricate floral patterns attracted as much attention as the text.

Architecture

The most prominent architect of Modern Style is Charles Rennie Mackintosh. He was based in Glasgow and took inspiration from Scottish baronial architecture fusing it with organic forms of plants and simplicity of Japanese design. This unique blend will give birth to a modern and distinct style for which he is known. He considered Scottish Baronial to be the national style of Scotland, and in 1890 he delivered a lecture to Glasgow Architectural Association on the subject of Scottish Baronial: 'How different is the study of Scottish Baronial architecture. Its original examples are at our doors... the monuments of our forefathers, the works of men bearing our own name'. Along with his most famous work, Glasgow School of Art almost all buildings he created are notable and important like Scotland Street School Museum, Queen's Cross Church, Glasgow, Hill House, Helensburgh. Along with built designs, there are quite few who were not built. He was moderately successful as an architect but will be brought to fame and his significance will be fully understood only after his death. One of his designs that were built posthumously is House for an Art Lover. Recurring motif in his designs is what will become known as the Mackintosh Rose or Glasgow Rose.

Another important architect was George Skipper, who had a great impact on the city of Norwich. His stand out work is Royal Arcade, Norwich which has 24 wooden bow-fronted shops and faience designed by W.J.Neatby. Writer and poet, John Betjeman said of Skipper: "He is altogether remarkable and original. He was to Norwich what Gaudi was to Barcelona"

Everard's Printing Works in Bristol is another icon of Modern Style. Architectural work by Henry Williams celebrates the history of printing from Gutenberg to William Morris. The facade is decorated with tiles in design by W.J.Neatby.

James Salmon (architect, born 1873) native of Glasgow who attended Glasgow School of Art from 1888 until 1895, and completed his apprenticeship in the office of William Leiper (1839–1916) had unique opus as well. "The Hatrack" (1899–1902) in St Vincent Street is his most famous work, with plenty of glass, highly detailed Modern Style facade and distinctive cupola that gave buildings its nickname.

Charles Harrison Townsend made a significant contribution to the style, some claim he was the only English architect to have worked in the new style. Like all architects and artist working in the new style he displays an affinity for nature motifs but his motif of choice was the tree.

Leslie Green was a Londoner who designed significant number of iconic London Underground stations in his hometown. His use of oxblood glazed architectural terra-cotta on the exterior of stations gave them distinct and somewhat flamboyant appearance. For the interiors he used the pleasant bottle-green terra-cotta.

Metalware and jewellery

Cymric was the name given to a range of original silver and jewellery that A. L. Liberty sponsored in 1898, and which was first exhibited at his shop in the spring of the following year. Although the mark registered at the Goldsmiths’ Company was entered in his name, the majority of the silver and jewellery was made by W. H. Haseler of Birmingham, who became a joint partner in the project, after designs supplied by Oliver Baker and the Silver Studio. Archibald Knox, a Manxman who had worked for Christopher Dresser, was one of the most gifted designers employed by the Silver Studio; he supplied the majority of Liberty metalwork designs between 1899 and 1912.

Tudric was the range name for pewterware made by W.H. Haseler's of Birmingham. The chief designer being Archibald Knox, together with David Veazey, Oliver Baker, and Rex Silver. Liberty & Co began producing Tudric in 1901 and continued to the 1930s. Tudric pewter differentiated from other pewters with better quality, it had a higher content of silver. Pewter is traditionally known as "the poor man's silver".

Guild and School of Handicraft established in 1888 by Charles Robert Ashbee made a significant contribution to the style in the medium. One of the founding members and first instructor in metalwork was John Pearson. Pearson is most famous for his work in copper, and his innovation of beating the copper out against a block of lead. Guild designs of belt buckles, jewellery, cutlery, and tableware were notable in influencing German and Austrian Art Nouveau artists.

Textiles and wallpaper
Thanks to William Morris, this medium will go through a renaissance. He did away with luxurious jacquard weaved silk furnishings on one end, and with cheap roller printed textiles and wallpapers on others. The focus of his attention, in Arts and Crafts spirit, was on traditional craft-based hand block printing and hand weaving. He will fully utilize these mediums with new patterns and unleash creativity in pattern design, shining new light, and changing people's perception of home furnishings. William's most iconic forms were unique plant-based compositions, in wallpaper from 1864 and printed textiles from 1874. Plants native to England were the essence of his design. C.F.A. Voysey will make a huge contribution to the field. Although an architect by profession he will be persuaded by his friend, Arthur Heygate Macmurdo, to try designing wallpapers. His designs were easier on the eye, one of his aphorisms was To be simple is the end, not the beginning, of design. He was admired on the continent by figures like Victor Horta and Henry van de Velde. In 1900 Journal of Decorative Art calls him fountainhead and the prophet of Art Nouveau.

Silver Studio founded by Arthur Silver in 1880 and later inherited by his son, Rex Silver, will have its heyday roughly from 1890 to 1910, at the peak of Modern Style. The studio started with Japanese inspired designs and will establish an important relationship with the Liberty department store, for which a lot of designs will be produced. Many talented designers worked for the studio, including John Illingworth Kay, Harry Napper, and Archibald Knox. In 1897 The Studio reported that le style Anglais was invading France, and that the majority of designers and manufacturers are content to copy and disfigure English patterns. The huge popularity of designs was reflected in the fact that by 1906 the number of designs sold to European manufacturers was 40%.

Ceramics

Christopher Dresser is without a doubt the most important ceramicist England had at the time, and maybe ever. His interest in ceramic will start in the 1860s and he will work for firms such as Linthorpe Art Pottery, Mintons, Wedgwood, Royal Worcester, Watcombe, Linthorpe, Old Hall at Hanley and Ault. He was inspired by nature, not surprising considering he was a botanist, but strongly rejected outright copying, instead of arguing stylized approach “If plants are employed as ornaments they must not be treated imitatively, but must be conventionally treated, or rendered into ornaments – a monkey can imitate, man can create”. In contrast to those designs, he also made bold, bright colored creations full of virility. In addition to Dressler, important designers working in the medium will be John W. Wadsworth and Léon-Victor Solon. In 1901, Wadsworth under the directorship of Solon will create a range called Secessionist Ware. Named after Vienna Secession that was very much in vogue post-1900, stylized floral designs and strong use of line will contribute significantly to the international movement. Even though Mackintosh did not create ceramics, his design influence that was both direct and indirect is hard to overstate.

Architectural ceramics
William James Neatby  started his foray into the ceramics at Burmantofts Potteries working as the architectural ceramics designer, he was previously working as an architect. He spent 6 years working for the company, from 1894 to 1890, and was its leading designer during that period. Neatby worked closely with the architect and designed numerous interiors and exteriors for hotels, hospitals, banks, restaurants and houses. The architect would only give Neatby the rough outline and he was able to understand the spirit of the undertaking and pick it up from there. This was achieved not only thanks to his artistic sensibility, but also his training as an architect. He would move to London and work for Doulton and Co. in 1890 where he was in charge of Doulton's architectural department for the design and production of mural ceramic. He spent 11 years with the company, and it was during this period that he designed his most famous work, Meat Hall at Harrods, London.

Glass

From a legislative and political standpoint, a significant moment for glass in Britain was the abolition of an 1851 tax on windows according to their size, this in turn led to larger windows, and larger use of glass in architecture and house design in general. 19th century had important innovations when it comes to glass manufacturing. In the 1820s technique of molding, glass was discovered, and in the 1870s the blown glass. Besides technique, new types of glass were also being explored. One of these new types of glass was Clutha glass, trademarked by James Couper & Sons in 1888. This glass, unlike the previous type of glass, had air bubbes purposely left, as it imitated ancient Roman glass and was in vogue at the time. Clutha line was designed by Dresser from 1888 until 1896 and was retailed by the ever-present Liberty department store. Dresser focused on the form and practicality of his designs, he had a great understanding of manufacturing technique "Glass has a molten state in which it can be blown into the most beautiful of shapes. This process is the work of but a few seconds. If material is worked in its most simple and befitting manner, the results are more beautiful than those which are arrived at by any roundabout method of production"

Gallery

References 

Art movements in Europe
Art Nouveau
Decorative arts